Prostaglandin E synthase 3 (cytosolic) is an enzyme that in humans is encoded by the PTGES3 gene.

The protein encoded by this gene is also known as p23 which functions as a chaperone which is required for proper functioning of the glucocorticoid and other steroid receptors.

References

Further reading